Aaron Jones (born 12 March 1994) is an English footballer who plays as a defender for National League club King's Lynn Town.

Playing career

Youth, college and amateur
Jones spent 10 years with Ipswich Town's development academy before moving to the United States to play college soccer at Georgia State University. He made a 36 appearances for the Panthers and tallied three goals and seven assists. On 8 January 2015, it was announced that Jones had decided to transfer to Clemson University. He made 39 appearances during his time with the Tigers and finished with four goals and seven assists.

Jones also played in the Premier Development League for Carolina Dynamo.

Professional
On 13 January 2017, Jones was drafted in the second round (33rd overall) of the 2017 MLS SuperDraft by Philadelphia Union. He signed a professional contract with the club a month later. On 1 April 2017, Jones made his professional debut with USL affiliate club Bethlehem Steel in a 3–2 defeat to Rochester Rhinos.

On 1 November 2017, Philadelphia declined their contract option on Jones.

King's Lynn Town
On 24 August 2018, upon his return from the US, Jones signed a two-year deal with Southern League Premier Central side King's Lynn Town.

References

External links

Clemson Tigers bio

1994 births
Living people
Sportspeople from Great Yarmouth
Footballers from Norfolk
Association football defenders
Philadelphia Union II players
North Carolina Fusion U23 players
Clemson Tigers men's soccer players
English footballers
English expatriate footballers
Georgia State Panthers men's soccer players
King's Lynn Town F.C. players
Philadelphia Union draft picks
Philadelphia Union players
USL Championship players
USL League Two players
English expatriate sportspeople in the United States
Expatriate soccer players in the United States